Deborah Kampmeier is an American film director, producer, screenwriter and acting teacher best known for her films "Split," (2016), Hounddog (2007), and Virgin (2003). Deborah began her career in theater as an actress after training at the National Shakespeare Conservatory from 1983 to 1985, and has taught acting in NYC for the past 20 years at such institutions as NYU, Stella Adler Studios, Michael Howard Studios, Playwrights Horizons and The National Shakespeare Conservatory. She currently teaches a Master Acting Class in New York City.

Films
Kampmeier made her first feature film Virgin starring Elisabeth Moss and Robin Wright Penn for $65,000 in 2003. The film picked up awards at the Hamptons Film Festival, Sedona Film Festival, Santa Fe Film Festival, Female Eye Film Festival in Toronto. The film was nominated for two Independent Spirit Awards, the John Cassevetes Award and a best actress award for Moss.

Kampmeier's film Hounddog debuted at the Sundance Film Festival in January 2007 in the dramatic category, where it was nominated for the Sundance Film Festival Grand Jury Prize. It also met with a significant amount of controversy over its content. The film features a 12-year-old girl named Lewellen played by Dakota Fanning, who lives with her "abusive father and alcoholic grandmother". The inclusion of a non-graphic rape scene caused Christian film critics and activists to negatively comment on the film, with it being called "child abuse" and Bill Donohue calling for a federal investigation against Kampmeier. Donohue stated that the film was breaking anti-pornography laws and that Dakota Fanning was being exploited.

The Sundance Film Festival organizer, Geoffrey Gilmore, praised Kampmeier for trying to cover "challenging material". Kampmeier responded to the criticism by explaining that Fanning and the two other child actors in the film, Cody Hanford and Isabelle Fuhrman, were only acting and decried the attacks against "my mother, my agent ... my teacher, who were all on the set that day" by critics. Fanning also stated herself, "I'm not going through anything like that, it's just my character. It's just another scene and wasn't any different from anything else I've done" and said that the controversy was "blown out of proportion".

In 2016, Kampmeier released her third feature-length film, "Split." It premiered in the Sarasota Film Festival on April 7, 2016. The film centers on a young actress, named Inanna, who is split from her full self when she falls in love with a mask-maker and the relationship takes on dark subtleties. The film draws from the ancient myth of the same name and stars Amy Ferguson, Morgan Spector, and Raina Von Waldenburg. The director's daughter, Sophia Oppenheim, also appears in the film in her acting debut. Indie Outlook described the film as "an arrestingly raw howl of fury at the global stigmatization of female sexuality.

Themes
Kampmeier is passionate about creating films that tell women's stories. She thinks that films showing women's stories are not better or worse than men's stories, but different. In an interview with Jan Lisa Huttner on March 11th, 2015, Kampmeier spoke about her film Virgin. The film is about a woman, Jessie, and her experience with date rape. In the interview, Kampmeier said that "one of the criticisms [she] hear[s] a lot is that there are no sympathetic male characters in Virgin". She also mentioned she had difficulty distributing the movie because when she explained that her target audience was women, she was told that "women aren't a ‘demographic,' at least not a demographic you can market to. Boyfriends and husbands make the decisions". She concludes that all of the roadblocks she faced in finding a distributor for Virgin cemented her desire to put the experience of being a woman on screen.

Television

In 2019, Kampmeier was selected by director Ava DuVernay to direct an episode of the television series, Queen Sugar. This marked Kampmeier's television directorial debut.

Filmography

Director
Film
 Tape (2020)
 Without Grace (Short) (2016)
 Split (2016)
 Peel (Short) (2016)
 Hounddog (2007)
 Virgin (2003)
Television
 Queen Sugar (2019)
 Cherish the Day (2020)
 Clarice (2021)
 FBI: International (2021)
 Tales of the Walking Dead (2022)
 Star Trek: Picard (2023)

Writer
 Split (2016)
 Peel (Short) (2016)
 Hounddog (2007)
 Virgin (2003)

Producer
 Ramona (Short) (2016)
 Split (2016)
 Peel (Short) (2016)
 Hounddog (2007)
 Virgin (2003)

References

Living people
American women film producers
Film producers from Tennessee
American women film directors
People from Chattanooga, Tennessee
1964 births
Film directors from Tennessee
Screenwriters from Tennessee
21st-century American women